The 2013–14 Northern Ireland Football League Cup (known as the WASP Solutions League Cup in the final for sponsorship purposes) was the 28th edition of Northern Ireland's secondary football knock-out cup competition, and the first season under the control of the Northern Ireland Football League. It was contested by the 12 members of the NIFL Premiership and the 30 members of the NIFL Championship. The competition began on 13 August 2013 and ended on 25 January 2014 with the final. The competition was without a principal sponsor up until the final, as Irn Bru ended their sponsorship following the conclusion of the 2012–13 competition. WASP Solutions became the Cup's new sponsor in January 2014.

Cliftonville were the defending champions after defeating Crusaders 4–0 in the 2012–13 final to become the sixth different winner of the cup in six seasons. Newington made their debut in the competition this season, following their promotion to the NIFL Championship for the first time in the club's history. 

In a repeat of the previous season, Cliftonville and Crusaders met in the final once again, which was played at Solitude for the first time. Cliftonville retained the trophy to lift it for the third time by winning 3–2 on penalties following a 0–0 draw after extra time. They became the first club to retain the trophy since Linfield won three consecutive cups in 1997–98, 1998–99 and 1999–2000.

Format
The competition was played in a straight knock-out format and was open to all members of the NIFL Premiership and both divisions of the NIFL Championship. The top 16 ranked clubs from last season received byes into the second round, which included the 12 members of the 2012–13 IFA Premiership and the top four ranked clubs from the 2012–13 IFA Championship 1. Of the remaining 26 Championship clubs, 20 entered the competition in the first round, with the other 6 given byes to the second round. The 6 clubs to receive byes were randomly drawn. Replays were not used in the competition - all matches used extra time and penalties to determine the winner if necessary.

First round
The draw for the first round was made on 26 July 2013. The games were played on 13 August 2013. The first round draw was made randomly and included 20 of the 30 clubs from the NIFL Championship. The top 16 ranked clubs from last season received byes into the second round, which included the 12 members of the 2012–13 IFA Premiership and the top four ranked clubs from the 2012–13 IFA Championship 1, along with six other randomly chosen Championship clubs, namely:

Ballymoney United, Bangor, Chimney Corner, Glebe Rangers, Newington and PSNI.

|-
|colspan="3" style="background:#E8FFD8;"|13 August 2013

|}

Second round
The second round draw was made on 12 August 2013, with the games played on 26 August 2013. The top 16 ranked clubs from last season entered the competition at this stage, along with the six other Championship clubs that received byes and the 10 winners from the first round. The second round draw was seeded, so that the top 16 clubs from last season avoided each other.

|-
|colspan="3" style="background:#E8FFD8;"|26 August 2013

|}

Third round
The third round draw was made on 17 August 2013, with the games played on 8 and 15 October 2013. Lurgan Celtic were the lowest ranked club to reach this round, as the only representative from Championship 2.

|-
|colspan="3" style="background:#E8FFD8;"|8 October 2013

|-
|colspan="3" style="background:#E8FFD8;"|15 October 2013

|}

Quarter-finals
The quarter-final draw was made on 9 October 2013, with the matches played on 12 November 2013. Bangor were the lowest ranked club to reach this round, as the only club from outside the NIFL Premiership.

Semi-finals
The semi-final draw was made on 16 November 2013, with the matches played on 17 December 2013.

Final
The final was played on 25 January 2014 at Solitude, Belfast.

See also
 2013–14 NIFL Premiership
 2013–14 NIFL Championship
 2013–14 Irish Cup

External links
NIFL Premiership official site

References

Lea
2013–14 domestic association football cups
2013–14